Mardin is a Turkish surname. Notable people with the surname include:

 Arif Mardin (1932–2006), Turkish-American music producer
 Joe Mardin, American record producer
 Şemsettin Mardin, Turkish diplomat
 Şerif Mardin (1927–2017), Turkish academic

Turkish-language surnames